Milton Keynes Thunder are an ice hockey team from Milton Keynes, Buckinghamshire, they are known stylistically as the Milton Keynes Rightmove Thunder for sponsorship purposes, and the team currently competes in the Britton Conference, of the National Ice Hockey League Division 1 South (the third tier of English National Ice Hockey). The team was founded in 2001 predominantly to provide competitive hockey and further development opportunities for players leaving the Milton Keynes Junior Ice Hockey system. Their home rink is the refurbished and renamed Planet Ice Arena, known locally as the Thunderdome. It has a capacity of circa 2,500.

Club history

Foundation

Founded in 2001, MK Thunder originally shared their home rink with the Milton Keynes Kings. However, the MK Kings were involved in a dispute with rink operators Planet Ice, which led to their relocation to Solihull in May 2002. The space left by the MK Kings was eventually taken by the Milton Keynes Lightning which was formed in 2002.

Position in the Milton Keynes Ice Hockey structure

As the second most senior ice hockey club in Milton Keynes, the MK Thunder have always played in the National Ice Hockey League South Division 1 or its former incarnations (English National League South, English National League South A and English National League South 1). It has been used as a vehicle to further develop Milton Keynes based players and has been a 'feeder' club for the senior hockey club Milton Keynes Lightning. The teams iced by the club have been dominated by local players, supplemented by the occasional import (league rules restrict the use of import players to just two, compared to five in the defunct old second tier EPIHL and eleven in the first tier EIHL).  The club also has links with the junior system and provides development opportunities for junior players at the Milton Keynes Storm Club.

Arena redevelopment
In March 2013, Milton Keynes Council approved plans to redevelop the Leisure Plaza after failed attempts in 2006 and 2011. The development of the arena was funded by Morrisons Supermarkets and took 17 months to complete. This forced Thunder to play their home games at a temporary rink sited within the Milton Keynes City Centre in a building vacated by the Supermarket Waitrose. The rink and the MK ICE charity established to operate it was organised by the team's owner and the then general manager, David Fairhurst. The team returned to the redeveloped rink which had been renamed the "MK Arena" in October 2014.

Club honours
NIHL League: 0
NIHL Playoffs: 0
NIHL BBO Cup: 1 2016-17
The Milton Keynes Thunder lifted their first silverware when they secured the NIHL South BBO Cup in the 2016-17 season.

Club roster 2022-23

Statistical records

Top ten appearances
League, Cup & Play Offs; as at end of 2021/22 Season

Top ten points scorers
League, Cup & Play Offs; as at end of 2021/22 Season

Top ten goal scorers
League, Cup & Play Offs; as at end of 2021/22 Season

Top ten goal assists
League, Cup & Play Offs; as at end of 2021/22 Season

Top ten penalty minutes
League, Cup & Play Offs; as at end of 2021/22 Season

Top ten points to game ratio
League, Cup & Play Offs; as at end of 2021/22 Season (Players with under 20 appearances not included)

Top ten goals to game ratio
League, Cup & Play Offs; as at end of 2021/22 Season (Players with under 20 appearances not included)

Top ten assists to game ratio
League, Cup & Play Offs; as at end of 2021/22 Season (Players with under 20 appearances not included)

Top ten penalty minutes to games ratio
League, Cup & Play Offs; as at end of 2021/22 Season (Players with under 20 appearances not included)

Top ten save percentages
League, Cup & Play Offs; as at end of 2021/22 Season (Players with under 20 appearances not included)

Retired Numbers

Season-by-season record

Associated teams
Milton Keynes Lightning
Milton Keynes Storm
Milton Keynes Hurricanes

References

External links
Milton Keynes Thunder
MKIH Forums
Planet Ice

Ice hockey teams in England
Sport in Milton Keynes